Megerlina is a genus of brachiopods belonging to the family Kraussinidae.

The species of this genus are found in Australia, Southern Africa.

Species:

Megerlina atkinosni 
Megerlina atkinsoni 
Megerlina capensis 
Megerlina davidsoni 
Megerlina dorothyae 
Megerlina irenae 
Megerlina lamarckiana 
Megerlina miracula 
Megerlina natalensis 
Megerlina pisum 
Megerlina striata

References

Terebratulida
Brachiopod genera